Muhammad Irfan bin Zakaria (born 4 June 1995) is a Malaysian professional footballer who plays for Sabah in the Malaysia Super League and the Malaysia national team. His primarily position as a defensive midfielder but can also play as a centre-back. A tough tackling, skilful and has a good vision defensive player. Irfan also in the squad for the 2017 SEA Games.

Club career

Return to Kuala Lumpur City
On 17 January 2021, it was announced Irfan has joined newly promoted club, Kuala Lumpur City for a second stint. On 16 March, Irfan made his second debut for the club in a 1–0 league defeat to Penang.

Sabah
On 2 December 2022, Irfan signed a contract with Sabah.

International career
Irfan represented Malaysian at under-23 and senior level.

Career statistics

Club

International

International goals
Scores and results list Malaysia's goal tally first.

Honours
Kuala Lumpur City
 Malaysia Cup: 2021
 Malaysia Premier League: 2017
 AFC Cup runner-up: 2022

Kedah Darul Aman
 Malaysia Super League runner-up: 2020

Malaysia U-23
 Southeast Asian Games
 Silver Medal: 2017

Malaysia
 AFF Championship runner-up: 2018

References

External links
 

1995 births
Living people
Sportspeople from Kuala Lumpur
Malaysian footballers
Kuala Lumpur City F.C. players
Association football midfielders
Southeast Asian Games silver medalists for Malaysia
Southeast Asian Games medalists in football
Association football central defenders
Footballers at the 2018 Asian Games
Competitors at the 2017 Southeast Asian Games
Asian Games competitors for Malaysia
Competitors at the 2019 Southeast Asian Games
Malaysia international footballers
Malaysia youth international footballers